The 1880 United States presidential election in Illinois took place on November 2, 1880, as part of the 1880 United States presidential election. Voters chose 21 representatives, or electors to the Electoral College, who voted for president and vice president.

Illinois voted for the Republican nominee, James A. Garfield, over the Democratic nominee, Winfield Scott Hancock. Garfield won the state by a margin of 6.55%.

Results

See also
 United States presidential elections in Illinois

References

Illinois
1880
1880 Illinois elections